This is a list of films set on or around Mother's Day.

Comedy
 Mother's Day (1993), an Austrian comedy film about a Viennese family preparing for Mother's Day
 Mother's Day (2016), an American romantic comedy film in which various people's lives intersect on Mother's Day
 Parking (2008), a Taiwanese black comedy set on Mother's Day in Taipei

Drama
 Going Shopping (2005), a romantic drama film about a clothing designer selling her shop's inventory in a sale over Mother's Day weekend

Horror
 Mother's Day (1980), a slasher film
 Mother's Day (2010), a loose remake of the 1980 film
 Mother's Day, a segment of the 2016 horror anthology film Holidays

References

Lists of films set around holidays
Mother's Day